K-68 is a  east–west state highway in the U.S. State of Kansas. K-68's western terminus is at U.S. Route 75 (US-75) and K-31 south of Lyndon and the eastern terminus is a continuation as Missouri Route 2 at the Missouri state line.

Route description

Beginning at US-75 and K-31 about a mile south of Lyndon. From here it heads east then reaches Quenemo, where it turns north and intersects K-268. Next it goes through Pomona. It continues east crossing the Marais des Cygnes River then turns northeastward and crosses the former route of US-59 near downtown Ottawa. As K-68 enters Ottawa, it intersects with I-35, US-59 and US-50 near the Walmart Distribution Center. Four miles west of Louisburg, K-68 intersects with US-169 and K-7, it also provides an end terminus with K-33 in Franklin County. It passes through Louisburg where it intersects with US-69. After passing Louisburg it reaches its eastern terminus at Missouri Route 2.

The Kansas Department of Transportation (KDOT) tracks the traffic levels on its highways, and in 2018, they determined that on average the traffic varied from 270 vehicles per day slightly west of Quenemo to 12,200 vehicles per day slightly east of US-69. The next highest volume of traffic was 8,820 vehicles per day slightly west of I-35 and 7,420 vehicles per day slightly west of US-69. K-68 is not included in the National Highway System. The National Highway System is a system of highways important to the nation's defense, economy, and mobility. K-68 does connect to the National Highway System at its western terminus at US-75, at its intersection with I-35 / US-50 / US-59, at its intersection with US-169 / K-7, and at its intersection with US-69. The section of K-68 in Ottawa from the west city limit to the interchange with I-35 is maintained by the city.

History
K-68 was first designated a state highway in 1929 and went from US-73W and US-50S in Ottawa eastward to US-73E in Louisburg. By April 1936, US-50S was realigned onto K-33 from south of Ottawa to K-31 east of Waverly and K-68 was extended west on the old US-50S alignment from Ottawa to US-75 by Lyndon. At that time K-33 was also truncated to end at K-68 east of Ottawa. Sometime between April 1933 and April 1936 US-73W was renumbered to US-59 and US-73E was renumbered to US-69. In a May 26, 1937 resolution K-68 was extended further east from US-69 to the Missouri border, which was first approved in a March 29, 1937 meeting. In a March 12, 1963 resolution, a  section of K-68 was realigned northwest of Paola to eliminate two curves. Then in a January 12, 1965 resolution, a  section of K-68 was realigned northeast of Paola to meet the section realigned in the March 12, 1963 resolution, which eliminated the overlap with US-169. US-50 Business (US-50 Bus.) originally overlapped K-68 in Ottawa, then in a November 6, 2000 resolution the US-50 Bus. designation was removed.

On May 21, 2019, the highway was closed north of Quenemo, due to flooding from Salt Creek.

Major intersections

See also
 List of Kansas numbered highways

References

External links

Kansas Department of Transportation State Map
KDOT: Historic State Maps

068
Transportation in Miami County, Kansas
Transportation in Franklin County, Kansas
Transportation in Osage County, Kansas
Ottawa, Kansas